This article shows the rosters of all participating teams at the 2019 FIVB Volleyball Women's Club World Championship in Shaoxing, China.

Pool A

Eczacıbaşı VitrA İstanbul
The following is the roster of the Turkish club Eczacıbaşı VitrA İstanbul in the 2019 FIVB Volleyball Women's Club World Championship.

 Head coach:  Marco Aurélio Motta

Guangdong Evergrande VC
The following is the roster of the Chinese club Guangdong Evergrande VC in the 2019 FIVB Volleyball Women's Club World Championship.

 Head coach:  Fang Yan

Imoco Volley Conegliano
The following is the roster of the Italian club Imoco Volley Conegliano in the 2019 FIVB Volleyball Women's Club World Championship.

 Head coach:  Daniele Santarelli

Itambé Minas
The following is the roster of the Brazilian club Itambé Minas in the 2019 FIVB Volleyball Women's Club World Championship.

 Head coach:  Nicola Negro

Pool B

Dentil Praia Clube
The following is the roster of the Brazilian club Dentil Praia Clube in the 2019 FIVB Volleyball Women's Club World Championship.

 Head coach:  Paulo Coco

Igor Gorgonzola Novara
The following is the roster of the Italian club Igor Gorgonzola Novara in the 2019 FIVB Volleyball Women's Club World Championship.

 Head coach:  Massimo Barbolini

Tianjin Bohai Bank VC
The following is the roster of the Chinese club Tianjin Bohai Bank VC in the 2019 FIVB Volleyball Women's Club World Championship.

 Head coach:  Chen Youquan

Vakıfbank İstanbul
The following is the roster of the Turkish club Vakıfbank İstanbul in the 2019 FIVB Volleyball Women's Club World Championship.

 Head coach:  Giovanni Guidetti

References

External links
Official website

2019 in women's volleyball
C